A BIC lighter is a disposable lighter in production by Société Bic since 1973.

Marketing
The BIC lighter was first mentioned in a 1972 Time magazine article reporting that BIC was currently in development of a lighter that could be lit up to 3,000 times before wearing out. In 1975, television commercials told potential consumers to "flick your BIC", a slogan that is still used today. The sexually charged slogan was an attempt to compete with the leading lighter manufacturer at the time, Gillette.

References

External links
BIC Lighter United States Official Homepage

Products introduced in 1973
Lighters (firelighting)
Disposable products